The South East Football Netball League was an Australian rules football competition,  containing teams near the south eastern region of Victoria, Australia.  The 8 teams were all part of the Casey Cardinia division of the Mornington Peninsula Nepean Football League (MPNFL) but this competition broke away to form a new league in 2015. At the end of 2018 the league opted to merge with the Yarra Valley Mountain District Football League.
The league currently consists of 8 teams spread over south-eastern Victoria. The current premiers are the Berwick Football Club.

History

The competition had its origins in the South West Gippsland FL from 1954 to 1994. In 1995 the league was rolled in the MPNFL and the administrative duties were taken by the MPNFL management. While under the MPNFL control there were three minor re-distributions of clubs and that created different divisions, most of the clubs were in the MPNFL Northern Division 1995–98; MPNFL Peninsula Division 1999–2004;& MPNFL Casey-Cardinia League 2005–2014

Breakaway

A spokesman for the CCFNL clubs Kahl Heinze said "There was excitement and elation to have reached this point in the process. Poor communication, a lack of financial transparency and management, lack of strategic direction and a lack of service to the CCFNL clubs were some of the grievances that led to the clubs pursuing the move for independence. We will be able to develop corporate partnership that spans both seniors and juniors specific to our region, build a dynamic and competitive competition in both football and netball that attracts other teams, hence the reason we’re not calling ourselves Casey Cardinia. We will be able to work with the juniors on what are the best pathways to senior footy.”

Clubs

Current Clubs

Former Clubs

Casey-Cardinia Division
 Dingley Dingoes (moved to Southern FL at the end of the 2006 season)
 Keysborough Burras (moved to Southern FL at the end of the 2014 season)

Recent Premierships

Casey-Cardinia Division

2015 Ladder

2016 Ladder

2017 Ladder

2018 Ladder

References

External links
 Official SEFNL website

Defunct Australian rules football competitions in Victoria (Australia)
Defunct netball leagues in Australia
Netball leagues in Victoria (Australia)